The Canadian federal budget for fiscal year 1981-1982 was presented by Minister of Finance Allan MacEachen in the House of Commons of Canada on 12 November 1981.

External links 

 Budget Speech
 Budget Papers
 Budget in Brief

References

Canadian budgets
Canadian federal budget
Canadian federal budget
Federal budget
Federal budget